The  Film Archive (Public Organization) (FA), also commonly referred to as the Thai Film Archive (TFA), is a film archive in Thailand. It was established in 1984 as the National Film Archive, operating under the Fine Arts Department. It was reorganized into a public organization under the oversight of the  Ministry of Culture in 2009. It is located in the Phutthamonthon District of Nakhon Pathom Province.

See also 
 National Film Heritage Registry
 List of film archives

References

External links 

Public organizations of Thailand
Film archives in Asia
Film organizations in Thailand
Archives in Thailand
Nakhon Pathom province
1984 establishments in Thailand